General elections were held in Japan on 14 December 2014. Voting took place in all Representatives constituencies of Japan including proportional blocks to elect the members of the House of Representatives, the lower house of the National Diet of Japan. As the cabinet resigns in the first post-election Diet session after a general House of Representatives election (Constitution, Article 70), the lower house election also led to a new election of the prime minister in the Diet, won by incumbent Shinzō Abe, and the appointment of a new cabinet (with some ministers re-appointed). The voter turnout in this election remains the lowest in Japanese history.

Background
In 2012, the Democratic Party government under Yoshihiko Noda decided to raise the Japanese consumption tax. This unpopular moved allowed the Liberal Democratic Party under Shinzo Abe to regain control of the Japanese government in the 2012 Japanese general election. Abe proceeded to implement a series of economic programs known as "Abenomics" in a bid to stimulate the economy. Despite these programs, Japan entered a technical recession in mid-2014, which Abe blamed on the consumption tax hike, even though many members of the LDP supported the hike. Abe called a snap election on November 18, in part for the purpose of winning LDP backing to postpone the hike and pursue the Abenomics package.

The LDP government was widely expected to win the election in a landslide, and many observers viewed the snap election as a mechanism for Abe to entrench his government at a time of relative popularity.

Under 2013 changes to the electoral law designed to reduce malapportionment, district boundaries in 17 prefectures were redrawn and five districts are eliminated without replacement (one each in Fukui, Yamanashi, Tokushima, Kōchi and Saga). The number of first-past-the-post seats is reduced to 295, the total number of seats decreases to 475.

Opinion polls
Parties' approval ratings from 2013–14
(Source: NHK)

Cabinet approval/disapproval ratings

Results

The LDP lost a small number of seats but slightly enlarged its majority coalition with Komeito. Turnout was a record low, and many voters viewed the election as a waste of time and money. DPJ president Banri Kaieda lost his seat in Tokyo while the Japanese Communist Party doubled in strength. The right-leaning Japan Innovation Party and Party for Future Generations lost seats.

By prefecture

By PR block

Notable losses
The most high-profile LDP candidate to lose re-election is Agriculture Minister Koya Nishikawa, who lost by 199 votes (0.2%) to former Governor of Tochigi Akio Fukuda. He was questioned in October after allegedly receiving financial support from a fraudulent company.

Amongst the DPJ members to lose their seats were party leader Banri Kaieda. Party for Future Generations leader Shintaro Ishihara was also unsuccessful in his attempt to win a seat after receiving a low position on his party's representative ballot.

Former leader of the now-dissolved Your Party and six-term representative for Tochigi-3rd district Yoshimi Watanabe was also defeated.

The JCP gained its first single-seat constituency seat since the 1996 election. Amidst a growing anti-base movement in Okinawa, JCP candidate Seiken Akamine unseated LDP incumbent Kōnosuke Kokuba in a night marked with a nationwide JCP surge.

Representatives

Members of House of Representatives elected from single-seat constituency

By-election

By-election for Aomori 4th district, Niigata 5th district, and Ehime 3rd district was scheduled to be held in October 2017, but by-election was canceled because the House of Representatives was dissolved and 2017 Japanese general election was held.

Members of House of Representatives elected from proportional representation block

People who were elected in PR following the resignation of another member of the House of Representatives

Aftermath
In November 2015, the Grand Bench of the Supreme Court ruled that the inequality in vote weight due to malapportionment was still in an unconstitutional state (iken jōtai); however, as in previous such rulings, it dismissed the demand to invalidate the election.

References

External links

Japan
General
General elections in Japan
December 2014 events in Japan